Melampus is a genus of small air-breathing salt marsh snails, pulmonate gastropod mollusks in the family Ellobiidae.

Species 
Species in the genus Melampus include:
 
 Melampus acinoides Morelet, 1889
 Melampus adamsianus L. Pfeiffer, 1855
 † Melampus antiquus Meek, 1873 
 Melampus bidentatus Say, 1822
 Melampus boholensis Pfeiffer, 1856
 Melampus bullaoides (Montagu, 1808)
 Melampus carolianus (Lesson, 1842)
 Melampus castaneus Mühlfeld, 1818
 Melampus ceylonicus (Petit de la Saussaye, 1843)
 Melampus coffea (Linnaeus, 1758)
 Melampus concretus Morelet, 1882
 Melampus cristatus Pfeiffer, 1854
 Melampus crossei de Morgan, 1885
 Melampus cumingianus (Récluz, 1846)
 Melampus exaratus H. Adams & A. Adams, 1854
 Melampus fasciatus (Deshayes, 1830)
 † Melampus feurtillensis Maillard, 1884 
 Melampus flavus (Gmelin, 1791)
 Melampus flexuosus Crosse, 1867
 Melampus floridanus Pfeiffer, 1856
 Melampus granifer (Mousson, 1849)
 Melampus granum Gassies, 1869
 Melampus hypoleucus E. von Martens, 1897
 Melampus liberianus H. Adams & A. Adams, 1854
 Melampus lividus (Deshayes, 1830)
 Melampus luteus (Quoy & Gaimard, 1832)
 Melampus massauensis L. Pfeiffer, 1858
 Melampus monile (Bruguiére, 1789)
 Melampus morrisoni Martins, 1996
 Melampus mousleyi Berry, 1964
 Melampus nucleolus Martens, 1856
 Melampus nuxeastaneus Kuroda, 1949 
 Melampus olivaceus Carpenter, 1857
 Melampus ovuloides Baird, 1873
 Melampus paranus (Morrrison, 1951)
 Melampus parvulus Pfeiffer, 1856
 Melampus pascus Odhner, 1922
 Melampus pfeifferianus Morelet, 1860
 Melampus phaeostylus Kobelt, 1869
 Melampus philippii (Küster, 1844)
 † Melampus pilula Tournouër, 1872 
 Melampus pulchellus (Petit de la Saussaye, 1843)
 Melampus quadrasi Möllendorff, 1894
 Melampus sculptus Pfeiffer, 1859
 Melampus semiaratus Connolly, 1912
 Melampus semiplicatus Pease, 1860
 Melampus semisulcatus Mousson, 1869
 Melampus sincaporensis Pfeiffer, 1855
 † Melampus sinuosus (Cossmann, 1895) 
 Melampus tabogensis (C.B. Adams, 1852)
 Melampus taeniolatus 
 † Melampus tenuistriatus de Morgan, 1917 
 † Melampus tridentatus F. E. Edwards, 1852 
 Melampus trilineatus C.B. Adams, 1852
 Melampus triticeus (Philippi, 1845)
 † Melampus turonensis (Deshayes, 1830) 
 Melampus variabilis Gassies, 1863

Taxon inquirendum
 Melampus avenaceus Mousson, 1870
 Melampus brevis Gassies, 1863
 Melampus bridgesii Carpenter, 1856 
 Melampus commodus H. Adams & A. Adams, 1854
 Melampus edentulus Martens, 1865
 Melampus exesus Gassies, 1874
 Melampus fuscus (Küster, 1843) 
 Melampus maurus (Küster, 1844) 
 Melampus mitralis H. Adams & A. Adams, 1854
 Melampus mucronatus Gould, 1852
 Melampus nitidulus H. Adams & A. Adams, 1854 
 Melampus obovatus H. Adams & A. Adams, 1854
 Melampus pallescens G. B. Sowerby I, 1839 (use in recent liteature currently undocumented)
 Melampus pusillus (Gmelin, 1791)
 Melampus pyriformis (Petit de la Saussaye, 1843)
 Melampus striatus Pease, 1861
 Melampus strictus Gassies, 1874
 Melampus sulculosus Martens, 1865
 † Melampus tournoueri Locard, 1878 
 Melampus viola (Lesson, 1831) (synonym: Auricula viola Lesson, 1831 )
 Melampus wilkei Dohrn, 1860
 Melampus wolfii K. Miller, 1879 (status in recent literature not researched by editor)
 Melampus zealandicus H. Adams & A. Adams, 1854
Species brought into synonymy
 Subgenus Melampus (Detracia) Gray, 1840 : synonym of Detracia Gray, 1840
 Melampus acutispira Turton, 1932: synonym of Melampus parvulus Pfeiffer, 1856
 Melampus aequalis Lowe, 1832: synonym of Ovatella aequalis (Lowe, 1832)
 Melampus albus Gassies, 1865: synonym of Microtralia alba (Gassies, 1865)
 Melampus biscayensis Fischer H., 1900: synonym of Pseudomelampus exiguus (Lowe, 1832)
 Melampus caffer (Küster, 1843): synonym of Melampus lividus (Deshayes, 1830)
 Melampus canariensis Nordsieck & Talavera, 1979: synonym of Pseudomelampus exiguus (Lowe, 1832)
 Melampus ceylanicus [sic]: synonym of Melampus ceylonicus (Petit de la Saussaye, 1843)
 Melampus coffeus (Linnaeus, 1758): synonym of Melampus coffea (Linnaeus, 1758)
 Melampus exiguus Lowe, 1832: synonym of Pseudomelampus exiguus (Lowe, 1832)
 Melampus fortis Mousson, 1869: synonym of Melampus flavus (Gmelin, 1791)
 Melampus gracilis Lowe, 1832: synonym of Myosotella myosotis (Draparnaud, 1801)
 Melampus hemphillii (Dall, 1884): synonym of Sayella hemphillii (Dall, 1884)
 Melampus kuesteri (Krauss in Küster, 1843): synonym of Melampus lividus (Deshayes, 1830)
 Melampus microspira Pilsbry, 1891: synonym of Melampus coffea (Linnaeus, 1758)
 Melampus monilis (Bruguière, 1789): synonym of Melampus monile (Bruguière, 1789)
 Melampus ordinarius Melvill & Ponsonby, 1901: synonym of Melampus lividus (Deshayes, 1830)
 Melampus patulus Lowe, 1832: synonym of Melampus luteus (Quoy & Gaimard, 1832)
 Melampus siamensis Martens, 1865: synonym of Melampus sincaporensis L. Pfeiffer, 1855
 Melampus singaporensis [sic]: synonym of Melampus sincaporensis L. Pfeiffer, 1855
 Melampus stutchburyi L. Pfeiffer, 185: synonym of Ophicardelus sulcatus H. Adams & A. Adams, 1854
 Melampus sulcatus Brazier, 1877: synonym of Ophicardelus sulcatus H. Adams & A. Adams, 1854
 Melampus tetricus Morelet, 1864: synonym of Pleuroloba quoyi (H. & A. Adams, 1854)
 Melampus umlaasianus (Küster, 1843): synonym of Melampus lividus (Deshayes, 1830)

References

External links
 Möllendorff, O. F. von. (1898). Verzeichnis der auf den Philippinen lebenden Landmollusken. Abhandlungen der Naturforschenden Gesellschaft zu Görlitz. 22: 26-208
 Adams, H. & Adams, A. (1853-1858). The genera of Recent Mollusca; arranged according to their organization. London, van Voorst. Vol. 1: xl + 484 pp.; vol. 2: 661 pp.; vol. 3: 138 pls.
 Martins, A. M. de F. (1996) Anatomy and systematics of the Western Atlantic Ellobiidae (Gastropoda: Pulmonata). Malacologia 37: 163-332

Ellobiidae